Factory Hill el.  is a mountain peak in the Red Mountains of Yellowstone National Park.  It is directly north of Mount Sheridan and west of the Heart Lake Geyser Basin.  Early in the history of Yellowstone, this peak was call Red Mountain by the Hayden surveys, a name later transferred to the range in which it resides.  In 1885, the Hague Geological Survey gave the peak its present name based on the following passage by Nathaniel P. Langford in his 1871 Scribner's account of the Washburn–Langford–Doane Expedition.  Langford's party was camped near the south arm of Yellowstone Lake at the time.

Factory Hill was so named because the noise and steam proceeding from them resembled in this respect an active factory town.

See also
 Mountains and mountain ranges of Yellowstone National Park

Notes

Mountains of Wyoming
Mountains of Yellowstone National Park
Mountains of Park County, Wyoming